Kill Chain is a 2019 American neo-noir crime thriller film written and directed by Ken Sanzel. The film stars Nicolas Cage, Enrico Colantoni, Anabelle Acosta, Angie Cepeda, Eddie Martinez, Alimi Ballard, and Ryan Kwanten.

Kill Chain was released in the United States through video on demand on October 18, 2019, by Amazon Studios.

Cast
 Nicolas Cage as Araña
 Anabelle Acosta as The Woman In Red
 Enrico Colantoni as The Old Sniper
 Ryan Kwanten as Ericson
 Angie Cepeda as The Very Bad Woman
 Eddie Martinez as Sanchez
 Jhon Bedoya as Garcia
 Alimi Ballard as The Curious Assassin
 Pedro Calvo as The Mean Assassin
 Yusuf Tangarife as Oso
 Luna Baxter as Gigi
 Jon Mack as Gigi's Friend
 Juan Andres Angulo as Delivery Boy
 Hector Alexander Gomez as Franco
 Eileen Jimenez as Franco's Daughter (9)
 Sara Elizabeth Avila as Franco's Daughter (17)

Reception
Chester C. Jones of Collider graded the film a D.

References

External links
 
 

2019 films
2019 crime thriller films
2019 independent films
American crime thriller films
American independent films
American gangster films
American neo-noir films
Films about assassinations
Films about snipers
Films set in Colombia
Films shot in Colombia
Amazon Studios films
CineTel Films films
Saturn Films films
Films scored by Mario Grigorov
2010s English-language films
2010s American films